Krain is either 

 Carniola, the German name of a historical region within the Duchy of Austria in modern Slovenia
 Krain Township, Minnesota, a township in Minnesota, US
 Krain, Washington, an unincorporated locality in King County
 Krain krain, the common name for the leafy vegetable Corchorus in Sierra Leone
 Krain, a word of slavic origin meaning borderland, used in several territorial names such as Ukraine (according to classical interpretation)